The Vizăuți is a left tributary of the river Putna in Romania. It discharges into the Putna near Vidra.

References

Rivers of Romania
Rivers of Vrancea County